Monica Seles was the defending champion and won in the final 4–6, 6–3, 6–4 against Arantxa Sánchez Vicario.

Seeds
A champion seed is indicated in bold text while text in italics indicates the round in which that seed was eliminated. The top four seeds received a bye to the second round.

  Arantxa Sánchez Vicario (final)
  Monica Seles (champion)
  Amanda Coetzer (second round)
  Dominique Van Roost (second round)
  Anna Kournikova (quarterfinals)
  Lisa Raymond (first round)
  Anke Huber (semifinals)
  Henrieta Nagyová (second round)

Draw

Final

Section 1

Section 2

External links
 1998 Toyota Princess Cup Draw

Toyota Princess Cup
1998 WTA Tour